Religious toleration may signify "no more than forbearance and the permission given by the adherents of a dominant religion for other religions to exist, even though the latter are looked on with disapproval as inferior, mistaken, or harmful". Historically, most incidents and writings pertaining to toleration involve the status of minority and dissenting viewpoints in relation to a dominant state religion.  However, religion is also sociological, and the practice of toleration has always had a political aspect as well.

An overview of the history of toleration and different cultures in which toleration has been practiced, and the ways in which such a paradoxical concept has developed into a guiding one, illuminates its contemporary use as political, social, religious, and ethnic, applying to LGBT individuals and other minorities, and other connected concepts such as human rights.

In Antiquity

Religious toleration has been described as a "remarkable feature" of the Achaemenid Empire of Persia.  Cyrus the Great assisted in the restoration of the sacred places of various cities. In the Old Testament, Cyrus was said to have released the Jews from the Babylonian captivity in 539–530 BCE, and permitted their return to their homeland.

The Hellenistic city of Alexandria, founded 331 BCE, contained a large Jewish community which lived in peace with equivalently sized Greek and Egyptian populations. According to Michael Walzer, the city provided "a useful example of what we might think of as the imperial version of multiculturalism."

Before Christianity became the state church of the Roman Empire, it encouraged conquered peoples to continue worshipping their own gods. "An important part of Roman propaganda was its invitation to the gods of conquered territories to enjoy the benefits of worship within the imperium." Christians were singled out for persecution because of their own rejection of Roman pantheism and refusal to honor the emperor as a god. There were some other groups that found themselves to be exceptions to Roman tolerance, such as the Druids, the early followers of the cult of Isis, the Bacchanals, the Manichaens and the priests of Cybele, and Temple Judaism was also suppressed. 

In the early 3rd century, Cassius Dio outlined the Roman imperial policy towards religious tolerance:

In 311 CE, Roman Emperor Galerius issued a general edict of toleration of Christianity, in his own name and in those of Licinius and Constantine I (who converted to Christianity the following year).

Buddhism

Buddhists have shown significant tolerance for other religions:
James Freeman Clarke said in Ten Great Religions (1871):

The Edicts of Ashoka issued by King Ashoka the Great (269–231 BCE), a Buddhist, declared ethnic and religious tolerance. His Edict in the 12th main stone writing of Girnar on the third century BCE which state that "Kings accepted religious tolerance and that Emperor Ashoka maintained that no one would consider his / her is to be superior to other and rather would follow a path of unity by accuring the essence of other religions".

However, Buddhism has also had  controversies regarding toleration. In addition, the question of possible intolerance among Buddhists in Sri Lanka and Myanmar, primarily against Muslims,  has been raised by Paul Fuller.

Christianity

The books of Exodus, Leviticus and Deuteronomy make similar statements about the treatment of strangers. For example, Exodus 22:21 says: "Thou shalt neither vex a stranger, nor oppress him: for ye were strangers in the land of Egypt". These texts are frequently used in sermons to plead for compassion and tolerance of those who are different from us and less powerful. Julia Kristeva elucidated a philosophy of political and religious toleration based on all of our mutual identities as strangers.

The New Testament Parable of the Tares, which speaks of the difficulty of distinguishing wheat from weeds before harvest time, has also been invoked in support of religious toleration. In his "Letter to Bishop Roger of Chalons", Bishop Wazo of Liege (c. 985–1048) relied on the parable to argue that "the church should let dissent grow with orthodoxy until the Lord comes to separate and judge them".

Roger Williams used this parable to support government toleration of all of the "weeds" (heretics) in the world, because civil persecution often inadvertently hurts the "wheat" (believers) too. Instead, Williams believed it was God's duty to judge in the end, not man's. This parable lent further support to Williams' belief in a wall of separation between church and state as described in his 1644 book, The Bloody Tenent of Persecution.

Middle Ages
In the Middle Ages, there were instances of toleration of particular groups. The Latin concept tolerantia was a "highly-developed political and judicial concept in medieval scholastic theology and canon law." Tolerantia was used to "denote the self-restraint of a civil power in the face of" outsiders, like infidels, Muslims or Jews, but also in the face of social groups like prostitutes and lepers. Heretics such as the Cathari, Waldensians, Jan Hus, and his followers, the Hussites, were persecuted. Later theologians belonging or reacting to the Protestant Reformation began discussion of the circumstances under which dissenting religious thought should be permitted. Toleration "as a government-sanctioned practice" in Christian countries, "the sense on which most discussion of the phenomenon relies—is not attested before the sixteenth century".

Unam sanctam and Extra Ecclesiam nulla salus
Centuries of Roman Catholic intoleration of other faiths was exemplified by Unam sanctam, a papal bull issued by Pope Boniface VIII on 18 November 1302. The bull laid down dogmatic propositions on the unity of the Catholic Church, the necessity of belonging to it for eternal salvation (Extra Ecclesiam nulla salus), the position of the Pope as supreme head of the Church, and the duty thence arising of submission to the Pope in order to belong to the Church and thus to attain salvation. The bull ends, "Furthermore, we declare, we proclaim, we define that it is absolutely necessary for salvation that every human creature be subject to the Roman Pontiff."

Tolerance of the Jews

In Poland in 1264, the Statute of Kalisz was issued, guaranteeing freedom of religion for the Jews in the country.

In 1348, Pope Clement VI (1291–1352) issued a bull pleading with Catholics not to murder Jews, whom they blamed for the Black Death. He noted that Jews died of the plague like anyone else, and that the disease also flourished in areas where there were no Jews. Christians who blamed and killed Jews had been "seduced by that liar, the Devil". He took Jews under his personal protection at Avignon, but his calls for other clergy to do so failed to be heeded.

Johann Reuchlin (1455–1522) was a German humanist and a scholar of Greek and Hebrew who opposed efforts by Johannes Pfefferkorn, backed by the Dominicans of Cologne, to confiscate all religious texts from the Jews as a first step towards their forcible conversion to the Catholic religion.

Despite occasional spontaneous episodes of pogroms and killings, as during the Black Death, Polish–Lithuanian Commonwealth was a relatively tolerant home for the Jews in the medieval period. In 1264, the Statute of Kalisz guaranteed safety, personal liberties, freedom of religion, trade, and travel to Jews. By the mid-16th century, the Polish–Lithuanian Commonwealth was home to 80% of the world's Jewish population. Jewish worship was officially recognized, with a Chief Rabbi originally appointed by the monarch. Jewish property ownership was also protected for much of the period, and Jews entered into business partnerships with members of the nobility.

Vladimiri
Paulus Vladimiri (c. 1370–1435) was a Polish scholar and rector who at the Council of Constance in 1414, presented a thesis, Tractatus de potestate papae et respectu infidelium (Treatise on the Power of the Pope and the Emperor Respecting Infidels). In it he argued that pagan and Christian nations could coexist in peace and criticized the Teutonic Order for its wars of conquest of native non-Christian peoples in Prussia and Lithuania. Vladimiri strongly supported the idea of conciliarism and pioneered the notion of peaceful coexistence among nations—a forerunner of modern theories of human rights. Throughout his political, diplomatic and university career, he expressed the view that a world guided by the principles of peace and mutual respect among nations was possible and that pagan nations had a right to peace and to possession of their own lands.

Erasmus

Desiderius Erasmus Roterodamus (1466–1536), was a Dutch Renaissance humanist and Catholic whose works laid a foundation for religious toleration. For example, in De libero arbitrio, opposing certain views of Martin Luther, Erasmus noted that religious disputants should be temperate in their language, "because in this way the truth, which is often lost amidst too much wrangling may be more surely perceived." Gary Remer writes, "Like Cicero, Erasmus concludes that truth is furthered by a more harmonious relationship between interlocutors." Although Erasmus did not oppose the punishment of heretics, in individual cases he generally argued for moderation and against the death penalty. He wrote, "It is better to cure a sick man than to kill him."

More
Saint Thomas More (1478–1535), Catholic Lord Chancellor of King Henry VIII and author, described a world of almost complete religious toleration in Utopia (1516), in which the Utopians "can hold various religious beliefs without persecution from the authorities." However, More's work is subject to various interpretations, and it is not clear that he felt that earthly society should be conducted the same way as in Utopia. Thus, in his three years as Lord Chancellor, More actively approved of the persecution of those who sought to undermine the Catholic faith in England.

Reformation
At the Diet of Worms (1521), Martin Luther refused to recant his beliefs citing freedom of conscience as his justification. According to Historian Hermann August Winkler, the individual's freedom of conscience became the hallmark of Protestantism. Luther was convinced that faith in Jesus Christ was the free gift of the Holy Spirit and could therefore not be forced on a person. Heresies could not be met with force, but with preaching the gospel revealed in the Bible. Luther: "Heretics should not be overcome with fire, but with written sermons." In Luther's view, the worldly authorities were entitled to expel heretics. Only if they undermine the public order, should they be executed. Later proponents of tolerance such as Sebastian Franck and Sebastian Castellio cited Luther's position. He had overcome, at least for the Protestant territories and countries, the violent medieval criminal procedures of dealing with heretics. But Luther remained rooted in the Middle Ages insofar as he considered the Anabaptists' refusal to take oaths, do military service, and the rejection of private property by some Anabaptist groups to be a political threat to the public order which would inevitably lead to anarchy and chaos. So Anabaptists were persecuted not only in Catholic but also in Lutheran and Reformed territories. However, a number of Protestant theologians such as John Calvin, Martin Bucer, Wolfgang Capito, and Johannes Brenz as well as Landgrave Philip of Hesse opposed the execution of Anabaptists. Ulrich Zwingli demanded the expulsion of persons who did not accept the Reformed beliefs, in some cases the execution of Anabaptist leaders. The young Michael Servetus also defended tolerance since 1531, in his letters to Johannes Oecolampadius, but during those years some Protestant theologians such as Bucer and Capito publicly expressed they thought he should be persecuted.  The trial against Servetus, an Antitrinitarian, in Geneva was not a case of church discipline but a criminal procedure based on the legal code of the Holy Roman Empire. Denying the Trinity doctrine was long considered to be the same as atheism in all churches. The Anabaptists made a considerable contribution to the development of tolerance in the early-modern era by incessantly demanding freedom of conscience and standing up for it with their patient suffering.

Castellio

Sebastian Castellio (1515–1563) was a French Protestant theologian who in 1554 published under a pseudonym the pamphlet Whether heretics should be persecuted (De haereticis, an sint persequendi) criticizing John Calvin's execution of Michael Servetus: "When Servetus fought with reasons and writings, he should have been repulsed by reasons and writings." Castellio concluded: "We can live together peacefully only when we control our intolerance. Even though there will always be differences of opinion from time to time, we can at any rate come to general understandings, can love one another, and can enter the bonds of peace, pending the day when we shall attain unity of faith." Castellio is remembered for the often quoted statement, "To kill a man is not to protect a doctrine, but it is to kill a man.

Bodin
Jean Bodin (1530–1596) was a French Catholic jurist and political philosopher. His Latin work Colloquium heptaplomeres de rerum sublimium arcanis abditis ("The Colloqium of the Seven") portrays a conversation about the nature of truth between seven cultivated men from diverse religious or philosophical backgrounds: a natural philosopher, a Calvinist, a Muslim, a Roman Catholic, a Lutheran, a Jew, and a skeptic. All agree to live in mutual respect and tolerance.

Montaigne
Michel de Montaigne (1533–1592), French Catholic essayist and statesman, moderated between the Catholic and Protestant sides in the Wars of Religion. Montaigne's theory of skepticism led to the conclusion that we cannot precipitously decide the error of others' views. Montaigne wrote in his famous "Essais": "It is putting a very high value on one's conjectures, to have a man roasted alive because of them...To kill people, there must be sharp and brilliant clarity."

Edict of Torda

In 1568, King John II Sigismund of Hungary, encouraged by his Unitarian Minister Francis David (Dávid Ferenc), issued the Edict of Torda decreeing religious toleration of all Christian denominations except Romanian Orthodoxy. It did not apply to Jews or Muslims but was nevertheless an extraordinary achievement of religious tolerance by the standards of 16th-century Europe.

Maximilian II
In 1571, Holy Roman Emperor Maximilian II granted religious toleration to the nobles of Lower Austria, their families and workers.

The Warsaw Confederation, 1573

The Polish–Lithuanian Commonwealth had a long tradition of religious freedom. The right to worship freely was a basic right given to all inhabitants of the Commonwealth throughout the 15th and early 16th centuries, however complete freedom of religion was officially recognized in the Polish–Lithuanian Commonwealth in 1573 in the Warsaw Confederation. The Commonwealth kept religious-freedom laws during an era when religious persecution was an everyday occurrence in the rest of Europe.

The Warsaw Confederation was a private compact signed by representatives of all the major religions in Polish and Lithuanian society, in which they pledged each other mutual support and tolerance. The confederation was incorporated into the Henrican articles, which constituted a virtual Polish–Lithuanian constitution.

Edict of Nantes
The Edict of Nantes, issued on April 13, 1598, by Henry IV of France, granted Protestants—notably Calvinist Huguenots—substantial rights in a nation where Catholicism was the state religion. The main concern was civil unity—the edict separated civil law from religious rights, treated non-Catholics as more than mere schismatics and heretics for the first time, and opened a path for secularism and tolerance. In offering general freedom of conscience to individuals, the edict offered many specific concessions to the Protestants, such as amnesty and the reinstatement of their civil rights, including the right to work in any field or for the State, and to bring grievances directly to the king. The edict marked the end of the religious wars in France that tore apart the population during the second half of the 16th century.

The Edict of Nantes was revoked in 1685 by King Louis XIV with the Edict of Fontainebleau, leading to renewed persecution of Protestants in France. Although strict enforcement of the revocation was relaxed during the reign of Louis XV, it was not until 102 years later, in 1787, when Louis XVI signed the Edict of Versailles—known as the Edict of Tolerance—that civil status and rights to form congregations by Protestants were restored.

The Enlightenment
Beginning in the Enlightenment commencing in the 1600s, politicians and commentators began formulating theories of religious toleration and basing legal codes on the concept. A distinction began to develop between civil tolerance, concerned with "the policy of the state towards religious dissent"., and ecclesiastical tolerance, concerned with the degree of diversity tolerated within a particular church.

Milton

John Milton (1608–1674), English Protestant poet and essayist, called in the Areopagitica for "the liberty to know, to utter, and to argue freely according to conscience, above all liberties" (applied, however, only to the conflicting Protestant denominations, and not to atheists, Jews, Muslims or even Catholics). "Milton argued for disestablishment as the only effective way of achieving broad toleration. Rather than force a man's conscience, government should recognize the persuasive force of the gospel."

Rudolph II
In 1609, Rudolph II decreed religious toleration in Bohemia.

In the American colonies

In 1636, Roger Williams and companions at the foundation of Rhode Island entered into a compact binding themselves "to be obedient to the majority only in civil things". Williams spoke of "democracie or popular government." Lucian Johnston writes, "Williams' intention was to grant an infinitely greater religious liberty than what existed anywhere in the world outside of the Colony of Maryland." In 1663, Charles II granted the colony a charter guaranteeing complete religious toleration.

Also in 1636, Congregationalist Thomas Hooker and a group of companions founded Connecticut. They combined the democratic form of government that had been developed by the Separatist Congregationalists in Plymouth Colony (Pilgrim Fathers) with unlimited freedom of conscience. Like Martin Luther, Hooker argued that as faith in Jesus Christ was the free gift of the Holy Spirit it could not be forced on a person.

In 1649 Maryland passed the Maryland Toleration Act, also known as the Act Concerning Religion, a law mandating religious tolerance for Trinitarian Christians only (excluding Nontrinitarian faiths). Passed on September 21, 1649 by the assembly of the Maryland colony, it was the first law requiring religious tolerance in the British North American colonies. The Calvert family sought enactment of the law to protect Catholic settlers and some of the other denominations that did not conform to the dominant Anglicanism of England and her colonies.

In 1657, New Amsterdam, governed by Dutch Calvinists, granted religious toleration to Jews. They had fled from Portuguese persecution in Brazil.

In the Province of Pennsylvania, William Penn and his fellow Quakers heavily imprinted their religious values of toleration on the Pennsylvania government. The Pennsylvania 1701 Charter of Privileges extended religious freedom to all monotheists, and government was open to all Christians.

Spinoza

Baruch Spinoza (1632–1677) was a Dutch Jewish philosopher. He published the Theological-Political Treatise anonymously in 1670, arguing (according to the Stanford Encyclopedia of Philosophy) that "the freedom to philosophize can not only be granted without injury to piety and the peace of the Commonwealth, but that the peace of the Commonwealth and Piety are endangered by the suppression of this freedom", and defending, "as a political ideal, the tolerant, secular, and democratic polity". After interpreting certain Biblical texts, Spinoza opted for tolerance and freedom of thought in his conclusion that "every person is in duty bound to adapt these religious dogmas to his own understanding and to interpret them for himself in whatever way makes him feel that he can the more readily accept them with full confidence and conviction."

Locke
English philosopher John Locke (1632–1704) published A Letter Concerning Toleration in 1689. Locke's work appeared amidst a fear that Catholicism might be taking over England, and responds to the problem of religion and government by proposing religious toleration as the answer.
Unlike Thomas Hobbes, who saw uniformity of religion as the key to a well-functioning civil society, Locke argued that more religious groups actually prevent civil unrest. In his opinion, civil unrest results from confrontations caused by any magistrate's attempt to prevent different religions from being practiced, rather than tolerating their proliferation. However, Locke denies religious tolerance for Catholics, for political reasons, and also for atheists because "Promises, covenants, and oaths, which are the bonds of human society, can have no hold upon an atheist". A passage Locke later added to An Essay Concerning Human Understanding questioned whether atheism was necessarily inimical to political obedience.

Bayle

Pierre Bayle (1647–1706) was a French Protestant scholar and philosopher who went into exile in Holland. In his "Dictionnaire Historique et Critique" and "Commentaire Philosophique" he advanced arguments for religious toleration (though, like some others of his time, he was not anxious to extend the same protection to Catholics he would to differing Protestant sects). Among his arguments were that every church believes it is the right one so "a heretical church would be in a position to persecute the true church". Bayle wrote that "the erroneous conscience procures for error the same rights and privileges that the orthodox conscience procures for truth."

Bayle was repelled by the use of scripture to justify coercion and violence: "One must transcribe almost the whole New Testament to collect all the Proofs it affords us of that Gentleness and Long-suffering, which constitute the distinguishing and essential Character of the Gospel." He did not regard toleration as a danger to the state, but to the contrary: "If the Multiplicity of Religions prejudices the State, it proceeds from their not bearing with one another but on the contrary endeavoring each to crush and destroy the other by methods of Persecution. In a word, all the Mischief arises not from Toleration, but from the want of it."

Toleration Act 1688
The Toleration Act 1688 adopted by the English Parliament allowed freedom of worship to Nonconformists who had pledged to the oaths of Allegiance and Supremacy and rejected transubstantiation. The Nonconformists were Protestants who dissented from the Church of England such as Baptists and Congregationalists. They were allowed their own places of worship and their own teachers, if they accepted certain oaths of allegiance. The Act, however, did not apply to Catholics and non-trinitarians, and continued the existing social and political disabilities for Dissenters, including their exclusion from political office and from the universities of Oxford and Cambridge.

Voltaire

François-Marie Arouet, the French writer, historian and philosopher known as Voltaire (1694–1778) published his Treatise on Toleration in 1763. In it he attacked religious views, but also said, "It does not require great art, or magnificently trained eloquence, to prove that Christians should tolerate each other. I, however, am going further: I say that we should regard all men as our brothers. What? The Turk my brother? The Chinaman my brother? The Jew? The Siam? Yes, without doubt; are we not all children of the same father and creatures of the same God?" On the other hand, Voltaire in his writings on religion was spiteful and intolerant of the practice of the Christian religion, and  Orthodox rabbi Joseph Telushkin has claimed that the most significant of Enlightenment hostility against Judaism was found in Voltaire.

Lessing
Gotthold Ephraim Lessing (1729–1781), German dramatist and philosopher, trusted in a "Christianity of Reason", in which human reason (initiated by criticism and dissent) would develop, even without help by divine revelation. His plays about Jewish characters and themes, such as "Die Juden" and "Nathan der Weise", "have usually been considered impressive pleas for social and religious toleration". The latter work contains the famous parable of the three rings, in which three sons represent the three Abrahamic religions, Christianity, Judaism, and Islam. Each son believes he has the one true ring passed down by their father, but judgment on which is correct is reserved to God.

Declaration of the Rights of Man and of the Citizen

The Declaration of the Rights of Man and of the Citizen (1789), adopted by the National Constituent Assembly during the French Revolution, states in Article 10: "No-one shall be interfered with for his opinions, even religious ones, provided that their practice does not disturb public order as established by the law." ("Nul ne doit être inquiété pour ses opinions, mêmes religieuses, pourvu que leur manifestation ne trouble pas l'ordre public établi par la loi.")

The First Amendment to the United States Constitution

The First Amendment to the United States Constitution, ratified along with the rest of the Bill of Rights on December 15, 1791, included the following words: "Congress shall make no law respecting an establishment of religion, or prohibiting the free exercise thereof..."
In 1802, Thomas Jefferson wrote a letter to the Danbury Baptists Association in which he said:
"...I contemplate with sovereign reverence that act of the whole American people which declared that their legislature should 'make no law respecting an establishment of religion, or prohibiting the free exercise thereof,' thus building a wall of separation between Church & State."

In the nineteenth century
The process of legislating religious toleration went unevenly forward, while philosophers continued to discuss the underlying rationale.

Roman Catholic Relief Act
The Roman Catholic Relief Act 1829 adopted by the Parliament in 1829 repealed the last of the criminal laws (TEST ACTS) aimed at Catholic citizens of Great Britain.

Mill
John Stuart Mill's arguments in "On Liberty" (1859) in support of the freedom of speech were phrased to include a defense of religious toleration:
 Let the opinions impugned be the belief of God and in a future state, or any of the commonly received doctrines of morality... But I must be permitted to observe that it is not the feeling sure of a doctrine (be it what it may) which I call an assumption of infallibility. It is the undertaking to decide that question for others, without allowing them to hear what can be said on the contrary side. And I denounce and reprobate this pretension not the less if it is put forth on the side of my most solemn convictions.

Syllabus of Errors
The Syllabus of Errors was issued by Pope Pius IX in 1864.  It condemns 80 errors or heresies, including the following propositions regarding religious toleration:

Renan

In his 1882 essay "What is a Nation?", French historian and philosopher Ernest Renan proposed a definition of nationhood based on "a spiritual principle" involving shared memories, rather than a common religious, racial or linguistic heritage. Thus members of any religious group could participate fully in the life of the nation. "You can be French, English, German, yet Catholic, Protestant, Jewish, or practicing no religion".

In the twentieth century
In 1948, the United Nations General Assembly adopted Article 18 of the Universal Declaration of Human Rights, which states:
 Everyone has the right to freedom of thought, conscience and religion; this right includes freedom to change his religion or belief, and freedom, either alone or in community with others and in public or private, to manifest his religion or belief in teaching, practice, worship and observance
Even though not formally legally binding, the Declaration has been adopted in or influenced many national constitutions since 1948. It also serves as the foundation for a growing number of international treaties and national laws and international, regional, national and sub-national institutions protecting and promoting human rights including the freedom of religion.

In 1965, the Catholic Vatican II Council issued the decree Dignitatis humanae (Religious Freedom) that states that all people must have the right to religious freedom.  The Catholic 1983 Code of Canon Law states:

In 1986, the first World Day of Prayer for Peace was held in Assisi. Representatives of one hundred and twenty different religions came together for prayer.

In 1988, in the spirit of Glasnost, Soviet general secretary Mikhail Gorbachev promised increased religious toleration.

Hinduism
The Rigveda says Ekam Sath Viprah Bahudha Vadanti which translates to "The truth is One, but sages call it by different Names". Consistent with this tradition, India chose to be a secular country even though it was divided partitioning on religious lines. Whatever intolerance Hindu scholars displayed towards other religions was subtle and symbolic and most likely was done to present a superior argument in defence of their own faith. Traditionally, Hindus showed their intolerance by withdrawing and avoiding contact with those whom they held in contempt, instead of using violence and aggression to strike fear in their hearts.
Pluralism and tolerance of diversity are built into Hindu theology India's long history is a testimony to its tolerance of religious diversity. Christianity came to India with St. Thomas in the first century CE, long before it became popular in the West. Judaism came to India after the Jewish temple was destroyed by the Romans in 70 CE and the Jews were expelled from their homeland. In a recent book titled "Who are the Jews of India?" (University of California Press, 2000), author Nathan Katz observes that India is the only country where the Jews were not persecuted. The Indian chapter is one of the happiest of the Jewish Diaspora. Both Christians and Jews have existed in a predominant Hindu India for centuries without being persecuted. Zoroastrians from Persia (present day Iran) entered India in the 7th century to flee Islamic conquest. They are known as Parsis in India. The Parsis are an affluent community in the city of Mumbai. Once treated as foreigners, they remain a minority community, yet still housing the richest business families in India; for example, the Tata family controls a huge industrial empire in various parts of the country. Mrs. Indira Gandhi, the powerful Prime Minister of India (1966–77; 1980–84), was married to Feroz Gandhi, a Parsi (no relation to Mahatma Gandhi).

Islam

The Quran, albeit having given importance to its 'true believers', commands its followers to tolerate 'the people of all faiths and communities' and to let them command their dignity, without breaking the Shariah law.

Certain verses of the Quran were interpreted to create a specially tolerated status for People of the Book, Jewish and Christian believers in the Old and New Testaments considered to have been a basis for Islamic religion:
Verily! Those who believe and those who are Jews and Christians, and Sabians, whoever believes in God and the Last Day and do righteous good deeds shall have their reward with their Lord, on them shall be no fear, nor shall they grieve.
Under Islamic law, Jews and Christians were considered dhimmis, a legal status inferior to that of a Muslim but superior to that of other non-Muslims.

Jewish communities in the Ottoman Empire held a protected status and continued to practice their own religion, as did Christians, though both were subject to additional restrictions, such as restrictions on the areas where they could live or work or in clothing, and both had to pay additional taxes. Yitzhak Sarfati, born in Germany, became the Chief Rabbi of Edirne and wrote a letter inviting European Jews to settle in the Ottoman Empire, in which he asked: "Is it not better for you to live under Muslims than under Christians?'". Sultan Beyazid II (1481–1512), issued a formal invitation to the Jews expelled from Catholic Spain and Portugal, leading to a wave of Jewish immigration.

According to Michael Walzer:
The established religion of the [Ottoman] empire was Islam, but three other religious communities—Greek Orthodox, Armenian Orthodox, and Jewish—were permitted to form autonomous organizations. These three were equal among themselves, without regard to their relative numerical strength. They were subject to the same restrictions vis-à-vis Muslims—with regard to dress, proselytizing, and intermarriage, for example—and were allowed the same legal control over their own members.

Judaism

Jews have been among the most persecuted group in the world and have faced waves of discrimination as early as 605 BCE, when Jews who lived in the Neo-Babylonian Empire were persecuted and deported. During the Spanish Inquisition, royal decrees to force the conversion to Christianity led to mass expulsion of Jews from Spain. A major target of the Portuguese Inquisition were the conversos, Jews who converted to Christianity and were accused of practicing Crypto-Judaism. 

Jews have also been used as scapegoats for tragedies and shortcomings, such as those seen in the Black Death Persecutions, the 1066 Granada Massacre, the Massacre of 1391 in Spain, the many Pogroms in the Russian Empire, and the tenets of Nazism prior to and during World War II, which lead to the Holocaust and the murder of six million Jews. In the post-war era, Jews were the subject of purges in the Soviet Union under Joseph Stalin, beginning in 1948. Stalin had plans to deport the entire Jewish population in the Soviet Union to Siberia.

Modern analyses and critiques
Contemporary commentators have highlighted situations in which toleration conflicts with widely held moral standards, national law, the principles of national identity, or other strongly held goals. Michael Walzer notes that the British in India tolerated the Hindu practice of suttee (ritual burning of a widow) until 1829. On the other hand, the United States declined to tolerate the Mormon practice of polygamy. The French head scarf controversy represents a conflict between religious practice and the French secular ideal. Toleration of the Romani people in European countries is a continuing issue.

Modern definition
Historian Alexandra Walsham notes that the modern understanding of the word "toleration" may be very different from its historic meaning. Toleration in modern parlance has been analyzed as a component of a liberal or libertarian view of human rights. Hans Oberdiek writes, "As long as no one is harmed or no one's fundamental rights are violated, the state should keep hands off, tolerating what those controlling the state find disgusting, deplorable or even debased. This for a long time has been the most prevalent defense of toleration by liberals... It is found, for example, in the writings of American philosophers John Rawls, Robert Nozick, Ronald Dworkin, Brian Barry, and a Canadian, Will Kymlicka, among others."

Isaiah Berlin attributes to Herbert Butterfield the notion that "toleration... implies a certain disrespect. I tolerate your absurd beliefs and your foolish acts, though I know them to be absurd and foolish. Mill would, I think, have agreed."

John Gray states that "When we tolerate a practice, a belief or a character trait, we let something be that we judge to be undesirable, false or at least inferior; our toleration expresses the conviction that, despite its badness, the object of toleration should be left alone." However, according to Gray, "new liberalism—the
liberalism of Rawls, Dworkin, Ackerman and suchlike" seems to imply that "it is wrong for government to discriminate in favour of, or against, any form of life animated by a definite conception of the good".

Tolerating the intolerant

Walzer, Karl Popper and John Rawls have discussed the paradox of tolerating intolerance. Walzer asks "Should we tolerate the intolerant?" He notes that most minority religious groups who are the beneficiaries of tolerance are themselves intolerant, at least in some respects. Rawls argues that an intolerant sect should be tolerated in a tolerant society unless the sect directly threatens the security of other members of the society. He links this principle to the stability of a tolerant society, in which members of an intolerant sect in a tolerant society will, over time, acquire the tolerance of the wider society.

Other criticisms and issues
Toleration has been described as undermining itself via moral relativism: "either the claim self-referentially undermines itself or it provides us with no compelling reason to believe it. If we are skeptical about knowledge, then we have no way of knowing that toleration is good."

Ronald Dworkin argues that in exchange for toleration, minorities must bear with the criticisms and insults which are part of the freedom of speech in an otherwise tolerant society. Dworkin has also questioned whether the United States is a "tolerant secular" nation, or is re-characterizing itself as a "tolerant religious" nation, based on the increasing re-introduction of religious themes into conservative politics. Dworkin concludes that "the tolerant secular model is preferable, although he invited people to use the concept of personal responsibility to argue in favor of the tolerant religious model."

In The End of Faith, Sam Harris asserts that society should be unwilling to tolerate unjustified religious beliefs about morality, spirituality, politics, and the origin of humanity, especially beliefs which promote violence.

See also
 Anekantavada
 A Critique of Pure Tolerance
 Freedom From Religion Foundation
 Freedom of religion
 Freedom of religion by country
 History of Christian thought on persecution and tolerance
 Islam and other religions
 Multifaith space
 Ontario Consultants on Religious Tolerance
 Religious discrimination
 Religious intolerance
 Religious persecution
 Religious pluralism
 Secular state
 Separation of church and state

Sources

References

Further reading
 
 
 
 Collins, Jeffrey R. "Redeeming the enlightenment: New histories of religious toleration." Journal of Modern History 81.3 (2009): 607–36. Historiography 1789 to 2009.
 
 
 
 
 
 
 
 
 Tausch, Arno. "Are Practicing Catholics More Tolerant of Other Religions than the Rest of the World? Comparative Analyses Based on World Values Survey Data" (November 21, 2017).
 
 
 Walsham, Alexandra. (2017) "Toleration, Pluralism, and Coexistence: The Ambivalent Legacies of the Reformation." Archiv für ReformationsgeschichteArchive for Reformation History 108.1 (2017): 181–90. Online

External links

 Religion and Foreign Policy Initiative, Council on Foreign Relations
 Background to the United Nations Universal Declaration of Human Rights
 Text of the United Nations Universal Declaration of Human Rights
 
 
 History of Religious Tolerance
 Outline for a Discussion on Toleration (Karen Barkey)
 
 Toleration, BBC Radio 4 discussion with Justin Champion, David Wootton & Sarah Barber (In Our Time, May 20, 2004)
 Teaching Tolerance
 Test Yourself for Hidden Bias

Religion and society
Religion